Giovanni Giacomo de Antiquis (?–1608) was an Italian composer who mainly wrote choral music. Some of his compositions are contained in Il primo libro a due voci de diversi autori di Bari (Venice 1585).

External links 
 
 

Italian classical composers
Italian male classical composers
Renaissance composers
1608 deaths